Martin John Williams  (born 3 November 1941), is a British diplomat. He was High Commissioner to New Zealand and concurrently the Governor of the Pitcairn Islands from 1998 to 2001.  Williams serves as a consultant to the New Zealand Antarctic Heritage Trust.

Career

Williams is a career member of the British Foreign Office having entered the FCO in 1963. His assignments include 1993-95 On loan to Northern Ireland Office, 1990-92 FCO (Head of South Asian Department), 1986-90 ROME (Head of Chancery), 1982-85 NEW DELHI (Head of Chancery), 1980-82 FCO (Assistant Head, Aid Policy Department), 1977-80 TEHRAN (First Secretary Commercial and Head of Chancery), 1974-77 FCO (Marine and Transport Department), 1972-73 FCO (On loan to Civil Service College), 1970-72 MILAN (Vice Consul Commercial), 1966-69 MANILA (Second Secretary Political), 1965-66 FCO (On loan to Civil Service College), 1964-65 FCO (Private Secretary to Permanent Under-Secretary), and 1963-64 FCO (Constitutional Department).

Personal life

Williams was born on 3 November 1941. He is married to the artist, Mrs Sue Williams. They have 2 sons, born 1966 and 1967.

References

1941 births
Living people
Commanders of the Royal Victorian Order
Governors of Pitcairn
High Commissioners of the United Kingdom to New Zealand
Officers of the Order of the British Empire